Karczewo may refer to the following places:
Karczewo, Gniezno County in Greater Poland Voivodeship (west-central Poland)
Karczewo, Golub-Dobrzyń County in Kuyavian-Pomeranian Voivodeship (north-central Poland)
Karczewo, Podlaskie Voivodeship (north-east Poland)
Karczewo, Grodzisk Wielkopolski County in Greater Poland Voivodeship (west-central Poland)